Mtoni may refer to:

Mtoni, Dar Es Salaam, Tanzania
Mtoni, Zanzibar, Zanzibar, Tanzania